Balitang America (Shorten to BA) was the flagship news program of TFC, produced by ABS-CBN International and ABS-CBN News and Current Affairs. The program, which was first hosted by Cara Subijano, had its debut as a weekly newscast covering the Filipino-American community on September 28, 2002. It was converted to a weeknight broadcast on May 7, 2007, and Gel Santos-Relos, an ABS-CBN News personality who had previously worked in the network's main office in the Philippines before moving to the US, took over as the host. Santos-Relos was succeeded as the newscast's anchor after she decided to retire by Ginger Conejero and TJ Manotoc. On July 16, 2021, the program came to an end, and TFC News Now North America took its place.

Overview
Balitang America was the first Filipino-American news program to ever be broadcast across all of North America; it was a 30-minute newscast with a national focus that aired via satellite on TFC and its local affiliate station in the San Francisco Bay Area, KTSF. The show was also shown on a slightly delayed basis on the ABS-CBN News Channel (ANC) in the Philippines. Similar to how ANC did it, the show incorporated English subtitles for the Tagalog soundbites in 2019.

Segments
 Balitang Canada - a once-a-week segment highlighting top news stories related to Filipinos in Canada. It became a separate newscast airing weekly from 2012 to 2014 on TFC Canada.
 Pinoy Datebook - the newscast's community calendar which featured community updates, events and public service announcements.
 Pinoy Panawagan - a regular segment hosted by immigration lawyer Lourdes Tancinco where she answers viewers' U.S. immigration and visa questions.
 World News Round-up - a quick look at global situations anchored by Tony Velasquez from ABS-CBN News Headquarters in Manila.
 Isyu Ngayon - viewers were encouraged to join in answering a daily poll, normally a question on the hottest topic of the day.
 Your Space - featured a viewer's letter read by the news anchor.
 Money Matters - remittance rates and gas prices update.
 Hollywood Buzz! - movie review hosted by Manuel dela Rosa, also known as Manny, the Movie Guy.
 Tourism - featuring tips on how to get great deals and tour packages.
 Hot Jobs - highlighted different types of employment.

Anchors

Final anchors
 TJ Manotoc - also serving as the current ABS-CBN News' North America Bureau Chief
 Ginger Conejero

Previous anchors
 Cara Subijano
 Gel Santos-Relos
 Ging Reyes - main fill-in anchor and ABS-CBN News' North America Bureau Chief from 2001 to 2010

References

External links
 Balitang America page at TFC website
 Balitang America at Telebisyon.net

The Filipino Channel original programming
2002 American television series debuts
2000s American television news shows
2010s American television news shows
2020s American television news shows
2021 American television series endings
English-language television shows
Filipino-language television shows